Seán Treacy (1895–1920) was an Irish Republican Army leader during the Irish War of Independence.

Seán Treacy may also refer to:

 Seán Treacy (politician) (1923–2018), former Irish politician
 Seán Treacy (hurler) (born 1965), Irish retired hurler

See also
 Sean Tracey (born 1980), American baseball player
 Sean Tracy (born 1963), New Zealand cricketer